Eugene Rabinowitch (April 27, 1901 – May 15, 1973) was a Russian-born American biophysicist who is known for his work in photosynthesis and nuclear energy. He was a co-author of the Franck Report and a co-founder in 1945 of the Bulletin of the Atomic Scientists, a global security and public policy magazine, which he edited until his death.

Early life

Rabinowitch was born Evgenii Isaakovich Rabinovich in Saint Petersburg; his parents were a lawyer and pianist. During WWI Rabinowitch studied chemistry in St. Petersburg. Initially a supporter of the Russian Revolution, he and his family fled to Kiev and then Warsaw with the onset of the Red Terror in late 1918. Ultimately fleeing to Germany, Rabinowitch was able to take a course Einstein taught on relativity, and attend academic events that included Max Planck and Max von Laue. He later worked with James Franck at Göttingen. After the Nazis came to power in Germany in 1933, Rabinowitch worked for a year with Nils Bohr in Denmark, before finding a job in London.

In 1932 Rabinowitch married Russian actress Anya Rabinowitch, and in 1934 the couple had twins, Victor and Alexander Rabinowitch.

Botany
Rabinowitch was studying the photochemical properties of chlorophyll at University College London in 1937 and 1938. In the summer he went to Marine Biological Laboratory and began to compile a bibliography on photosynthesis. This work grew into a book published April 1945 that he wrote largely during the summers at Woods Hole.

When Rabinowitch arrived in New York City, he was assisted by Selig Hecht,
a man whose spontaneous sympathy, friendship and assistance were so generously given to me when I first came to America and felt lost in the human sea of New York.

The American Association for Advancement of Science sponsored symposia that Rabinowitch attended: 1939 in Columbus and 1941 at Gibson Island supporting research on the book. Rabinowitch credits Selig Hecht with help in the early stages, and Hans Gaffron for reading the manuscript.

After World War II, Rabinowitch taught and researched botany as a professor at the University of Illinois at Urbana-Champaign, continuing his photosynthesis work and publishing the three-volume Photosynthesis and Related Processes.

In 1965 he and his student Govindjee contributed an article to Scientific American on the role of chlorophyll in photosynthesis.

On the occasion of the bicentential of the discovery of photosynthesis, Rabinowitch penned a summary of the stages of this development. A key step was Joseph Priestley's  experiment with a sprig of mint to restore oxygen to  a vessel depleted of this element by  a burning candle. Jan Ingenhousz noted the factors of sunlight and green leaves, Jean Senebier noted the necessity of "fixed air" (carbon dioxide), Nicolas Théodore de Saussure noted the role of water, and Julius Robert Mayer noted the transmutation of light to potential chemical energy.

A bibliography of Rabinowitch's publications was compiled by Govindjee at the Department of Botany, University of Illinois. The papers of Rabinowitch are held in the Special Collections at the University of Chicago Library.

Nuclear energy
During World War II, Rabinowitch worked in the Metallurgical Laboratory (or "Met Lab"), the Manhattan Project's division at the University of Chicago. At that time he was a member of the Committee on Political and Social Problems, chaired by James Franck. Rabinowitch wrote (with help from Leó Szilárd) what became known as the Franck Report. The report recommended that nuclear energy be brought under civilian rather than military control and argued that the United States should demonstrate the atomic bomb to world leaders in an uninhabited desert or barren island before using it in combat.

The social and ethical concerns expressed in the Franck Report translated into the guiding principles of the Bulletin of the Atomic Scientists, founded by Rabinowitch and fellow physicist Hyman Goldsmith. In the twenty-fifth anniversary issue of the Bulletin, Rabinowitch wrote that the magazine's purpose "was to awaken the public to full understanding of the horrendous reality of nuclear weapons and of their far-reaching implications for the future of mankind; to warn of the inevitability of other nations acquiring nuclear weapons within a few years, and of the futility of relying on America's possession of the 'secret' of the bomb." Over the years, Rabinowitch wrote more than 100 articles for the magazine, most of them editorials.

According to the historian of the Pugwash Conferences,
Eugene Rabinowitch was one of the first to call and work for setting up of international discussions; it is largely due to his enthusiasm and devotion that many of the events recorded here have materialized. One example of his untiring efforts was the convening of an informal talk in September 1951 in Chicago, during a conference on nuclear physics attended by scientists from many countries.

In 1959 he re-issued Explaining the Atom that Selig Hecht had written in 1947 when nuclear energy was a novel concept.

References

External links
 Govindjee (2004) , chapter 12 of No Boundaries edited by Lillian Hoddeson
 Eugene Rabinowitch (December 1952) "A Sustained Reaction," Bulletin of the Atomic Scientists. Reprinted in abridged form from the Nov/Dec 2005 issue of the Bulletin.
 Alexander Rabinowitch (January/February 2005) "Founder and Father," Bulletin of the Atomic Scientists.
 Josh Schollmeyer (January/February 2005) "Minority Report," Bulletin of the Atomic Scientists.
 The voice of Eugene Rabinowitch & the 1980 Rabinowitch Prize Essay Bulletin of the Atomic Scientists, January 1981.
Guide to the Eugene I. Rabinowitch Papers at the University of Chicago Special Collections Research Center

1901 births
1973 deaths
Manhattan Project people
Russian Jews
Jewish American scientists
20th-century American botanists
American anti–nuclear weapons activists
20th-century American physicists
Kalinga Prize recipients
University of Illinois faculty
Jewish emigrants from Nazi Germany to the United States